Delhi Public School, Durg is a public school in the Durg district in the state of Chhattisgarh.

The campus is home to about 4000 students, and employs 150 teachers. Founded in 2003, the school is located on Junwani Road, Chhattisgarh.

History
The school was founded by Industrialist and Philanthropist Chaudhary Sri. Mitter Sen Sindhu in 2003 under Sindhu Education Foundation that runs several educational trusts and institutes under Indus Group of Institutions and Param Mitra Manav Nirman Sansthan.

Description
The school is affiliated with Delhi Public School Society (one of the largest institutions providing education at school level in India) and Central Board of Secondary Education, New Delhi (CBSE).

The school's principal is Mr Yashpal Sharma. The school is under the aegis of Delhi Public School Society, New Delhi, established in 1949. The school has more than 4000 students and 150 teachers.

It has well equipped laboratories, libraries, computer rooms, classrooms, music room, and school transport.

See also
Education in India
Literacy in India

References

External links
 Official Website

Schools in Durg
Schools in Chhattisgarh
Educational institutions established in 2003
Delhi Public School Society
Buildings and structures in Durg
2003 establishments in Chhattisgarh